Glenea laosensis is a species of beetle in the family Cerambycidae. It was described by Stephan von Breuning in 1956. It is known from Laos.

References

laosensis
Beetles described in 1956